Eurhodope cruentella is a species of snout moth in the genus Eurhodope. It was described by Philogène Auguste Joseph Duponchel in 1842. It is found in Spain and France.

References

Moths described in 1842
Phycitini
Moths of Europe